The Purdue University College of Engineering is the engineering school and one of eight major academic divisions of Purdue University, a public research university in West Lafayette, Indiana. Established in 2004, its forerunner began in 1874 with programs in Civil and Mechanical Engineering. 

The college now offers B.S., M.S., and Ph.D. degrees in more than a dozen disciplines. Purdue's engineering program has also educated 27 of America's astronauts, including Neil Armstrong and Eugene Cernan, who were the first and last astronauts to have walked on the Moon, respectively. Many of Purdue's engineering disciplines are recognized as top-ten programs in the U.S. The college as a whole is currently ranked 4th in the U.S. of all doctorate-granting engineering schools by U.S. News & World Report.

Departments
The College of Engineering contains eleven Schools, two Divisions, and several Programs:

Schools
 School of Aeronautics and Astronautics.
 School of Agricultural and Biological Engineering.
 Weldon School of Biomedical Engineering
 Davidson School of Chemical Engineering
 Lyles School of Civil Engineering.
 Elmore Family School of Electrical and Computer Engineering.
 School of Engineering Education.
 School of Industrial Engineering.
 School of Materials Engineering.
 School of Mechanical Engineering.
 School of Nuclear Engineering.

Divisions
 Construction Engineering and Management
 Environmental and Ecological Engineering

Location

Neil Armstrong Hall of Engineering, named after astronaut Neil Armstrong, is the flagship of the College of Engineering and home to its administrative offices, the School of Aeronautics and Astronautics, the School of Materials Engineering, Engineering Projects In Community Service (EPICS), Engineering Education, the Minority Engineering Program, and the Women in Engineering Program. Many other campus buildings house faculty offices, classrooms, and laboratories for engineering programs, such as the Martin C. Jischke Hall of Biomedical Engineering, the Forney Hall of Chemical Engineering, and Potter Engineering Center.

History

The Morrill Act, signed by U.S. President Abraham Lincoln in 1862, set the stage for the state of Indiana to establish a college for agriculture and the mechanical arts. In 1874, Purdue established four-year bachelor's degree programs in civil engineering and mechanical engineering. The School of Mechanical Engineering was created in 1882, although none of Purdue's students at the time were actually qualified to enroll in any of its courses. In 1911, the School of Chemical Engineering was founded, and in 1938 became the School of Chemical and Metallurgical Engineering. The Agricultural Engineering program was established in 1925; it would be renamed the Division of Agricultural and Biological Engineering in 2005. In 1942, the School of Mechanical Engineering was renamed the School of Mechanical and Aeronautical Engineering; the Aeronautical Engineering program would be split out into the School of Aeronautics in 1945 and the School of Aeronautical Engineering in 1953. This was also the year that Purdue established the nation's first Freshmen Engineering program (now First Year Engineering), in which all first-year engineering students take fundamental courses prior to enrolling in the school for their specific discipline. That same year, the Industrial Engineering Department was founded, with some courses taught by Lillian Moller Gilbreth. In 1959, the School of Chemical and Metallurgical Engineering split into two separate units, the latter's segment of which was to be renamed the School of Materials Engineering in 1973.

The 1960s saw the establishment of the Nuclear Engineering and Women in Engineering programs. A 1 kilowatt nuclear reactor has been in operation at the campus since 1962. In 1971, the National Society of Black Engineers was founded on the Purdue campus by two undergraduates. The Construction Engineering and Management Division was created in 1976. In 1989, the Materials and Electrical Engineering Building was completed, providing much-needed space for the growing School of Materials Engineering and School of Electrical Engineering. In 1995, the Engineering Projects In Community Service program was established at Purdue. Three years later, Purdue's Biomedical Engineering program was founded; in 2004, it was expanded into the Weldon School of Biomedical Engineering. That same year, the Department (now School) of Engineering Education, the first of its kind in the nation, was created.

Also in 2004, the College of Engineering was formed as an umbrella organization for the many Schools, Departments, and Divisions of Purdue's engineering programs. Three significant College of Engineering structures would be built over the next few years: the Birck Nanotechnology Center (2005) and the Biomedical Engineering Building (now the Martin C. Jischke Hall of Biomedical Engineering) (2006), both part of Discovery Park); and the Neil Armstrong Hall of Engineering, completed in 2007.

Rankings
The College of Engineering's undergraduate and graduate engineering programs are highly ranked by U.S. News & World Report as some of the best engineering programs in America. Many of Purdue's engineering programs are ranked within the top 10 nationally, or near the top 10, resulting in Purdue's College of Engineering coming in 10th for undergraduate programs and 4th for graduate programs in the United States. The 2022 rankings are listed below.

Programs
Purdue's College of Engineering offers many programs to its students which help young engineers gain real world and international experience.
These programs include: 
 College of Engineering Honors Program
 First-Year Engineering Program
 Office of Future Engineers
 EPICS (Engineering Projects in Community Service)
 Global Engineering Programs and Partnerships
 Indiana Space Grant Consortium
 Minority Engineering Program
 Professional Practice (Co-op) Program
 Women in Engineering Program
 Innovation and Leadership Studies

Student organizations

 American Institute of Chemical Engineers (AIChE)
 American Society of Agricultural Biological Engineers (ASABE)
 Biomedical Engineering Society (BMES)
 Construction Engineers of the Future (CEF)
 Electrical and Computer Engineering Student Society (ECESS)
Institute of Electrical and Electronics Engineers (IEEE)
Eta Kappa Nu (ECE Honor Society)
 National Society of Black Engineers (NSBE)
Omega Chi Epsilon (CHE Honor Society)
 Purdue Engineering Student Council (PESC)
 Purdue iGEM 
 Purdue Mechanical Engineering Ambassadors (PMEA)
 Purdue Society of Professional Engineers (PSPE)
 Society for Biological Engineering (SBE)
 Society of Environmental & Ecological Engineers (SEEE)
 Society of Women Engineers (SWE)
 Students for the Exploration & Development of Space (SEDS)
The list of clubs and student organizations at Purdue is always growing. There are many other organizations apart from these actively running on campus that help enrich the social, cultural, and educational experiences of Purdue students and help enhance the overall diversity at the University.

References

External links
 Official website

Educational institutions established in 1874
Neil Armstrong
Engineering schools and colleges in the United States
Engineering universities and colleges in Indiana
1874 establishments in Indiana